Nazrin Jafarova (born 16 November 1997) is an Azerbaijani tennis player.

Jafarova made her WTA tour debut at the 2013 Baku Cup, having received a wildcard into the main draw, but lost in the first round to world number 62 Donna Vekić of Croatia. She was also granted a wildcard into the doubles tournament with Tamari Chalaganidze, but the pair lost to Ilona Kremen and Marina Melnikova in the first round.

References

External links 
 
 

1997 births
Living people
Azerbaijani female tennis players
21st-century Azerbaijani women